The Flintstones is an American animated sitcom produced by Hanna-Barbera Productions. The series takes place in a romanticized Stone Age setting and follows the activities of the titular family, the Flintstones, and their next-door neighbors, the Rubbles. It was originally broadcast on ABC from September 30, 1960, to April 1, 1966, and was the first animated series to hold a prime-time slot on television.

The show follows the lives of Fred and Wilma Flintstone and their pet dinosaur Dino, eventually seeing the addition of baby Pebbles. Barney and Betty Rubble are their neighbors and best friends. They adopt a super-strong baby named Bamm-Bamm and acquire a pet hopparoo called Hoppy. 

Producers William Hanna and Joseph Barbera, who earned seven Academy Awards for Tom and Jerry, and their staff faced a challenge in developing a thirty-minute animated program with one storyline that fit the parameters of family-based domestic situation comedy of the era. After considering several settings and selecting the Stone Age, one of several inspirations was The Honeymooners (in itself traceable to The Bickersons and Laurel and Hardy), which Hanna freely praised as one of the finest comedies on television. The show's animation required a balance of visual as well as verbal storytelling that the studio created and others imitated. 

The continuing popularity of The Flintstones rests heavily on its juxtaposition of modern everyday concerns in the Stone Age setting. The Flintstones was the most financially successful and longest-running network animated television series for three decades, until The Simpsons surpassed it in 1997. In 2013, TV Guide ranked The Flintstones the second-greatest TV cartoon of all time (after The Simpsons).

Overview
The show is set in a comical version of the Stone Age, with added features and technologies that resemble mid-20th-century suburban America. The plots deliberately resemble the sitcoms of the era, with the caveman Flintstone and Rubble families getting into minor conflicts characteristic of modern life. The show is set in the Stone Age town of Bedrock (pop. 2,500). Dinosaurs and other prehistoric creatures are portrayed as co-existing with cavemen, saber-toothed cats, and woolly mammoths.

Animation historian Christopher P. Lehman considers that the series draws its humor in part from creative uses of anachronisms. The main one is the placing of a "modern", 20th-century society in prehistory. This society takes inspiration from the suburban sprawl developed in the first two decades of the postwar period. This society has modern home appliances which work by employing animals. They have automobiles, but they hardly resemble the cars of the 20th century. These cars are large wooden and rock structures, powered by people who run while inside them. This depiction varies; on some occasions, the cars appear to have engines (with appropriate sound effects), requiring ignition keys and some representation of gasoline. Fred might pull into a gas station and say, "Fill 'er up with Ethel", which is pumped through the trunk of a woolly mammoth marked "ETHEL". Whether the car runs by foot or by gas varies according to the needs of the story. Finally, the stone houses of this society are cookie-cutter homes positioned into neighborhoods typical of mid-20th-century American suburbs.

Characters

The Flintstones
 Fred Flintstone – The main character of the series and the husband and father in the title family, Fred is an accident-prone operator of a bronto-crane (a Brontosaurus used as an excavating machine) at the Slate Rock and Gravel Company who is overweight and likes to eat copious amounts of marginally healthy or unhealthy food. He is quick to anger (usually over trivial matters) but is a very loving husband and father. He is also good at bowling and is a member of the fictional "Loyal Order of Water Buffaloes" Lodge No. 26 (originally called the Loyal Order of Dinosaurs in Season 1), a men-only club paralleling real-life fraternities such as the Loyal Order of Moose. His famous catchphrase is "Yabba Dabba Doo!", revealed in season one as the Lodge's official cheer.
 Wilma Flintstone – Fred's wife and Pebbles's mother, she is more intelligent and level-headed than her husband, though she often has a habit of spending money (with Betty's and her catchphrase being "Da-da-da duh da-da CHARGE it!!"). She often is a foil to Fred's poor behavior, but is a very loyal wife to him. She is also a very jealous woman, who is easily angered if even a hint exists of another woman (especially a pretty one) having anything to do with Fred.
 Pebbles Flintstone – The Flintstones' infant daughter, is born near the end of the third season. She normally wears a bone in her hair holding up her ponytail, and a light green and black colored shirt with a turquoise and black diaper. She (much like her family) does not wear shoes or pants.
 Dino (pronounced "dee-no") – The Flintstones' pet dinosaur, acts like a dog. A running gag in the series involves Fred coming home from work and Dino getting excited and knocking him down and licking his face repeatedly.
 Baby Puss – The Flintstones' pet saber-toothed cat is rarely seen in the actual series, but is always seen throwing Fred out of the house during the end credits, causing Fred to pound repeatedly on the front door and yell "Wilma!", waking the whole neighborhood in the process.

Relatives of the Flintstones
 Pearl Slaghoople – Wilma's hard-to-please mother, Fred's mother-in-law and Pebbles's grandmother, she is constantly disapproving of Fred and his behavior. She did not have a last name in her first appearances in season two and three. They briefly reconciled in the episode "Mother-in-Law's Visit", which originally aired on February 1, 1963, until she found out that she became Fred's "nice fat pigeon" when he suckered her out of money that he needed to buy a baby crib for Pebbles. They are reconciled again at the end of the 1993 TV movie I Yabba Dabba Do. Their disastrous first meeting was recounted in flashback in the episode "Bachelor Daze", which originally aired on March 5, 1964. In the episode, her last name was identified as "Mrs. Slaghoople." The first name of "Pearl" was created after the original series ended in 1966.
 Uncle Tex Hardrock – Fred's maternal uncle, Wilma’s uncle-in-law and Pebbles‘s great-uncle who’s a member of the Texarock Rangers, he constantly holds Fred's future inheritance over his head.

The Rubbles
 Bernard Matthew "Barney" Rubble – The secondary main character and Fred's best friend and next-door neighbor, he is nearly six inches shorter and also overweight; his occupation is, throughout most of the series, unknown, though later episodes depict him working in the same quarry as Fred. He shares many of Fred's interests, such as bowling and golf, and is also a member of the Loyal Order of Water Buffaloes. Though Fred and Barney frequently get into feuds with one another (usually due to Fred's short temper), their deep fraternal bond remains very evident.
 Elizabeth Jean "Betty" Rubble – Barney's wife and Wilma's best friend, like Wilma she has a habit of spending money and also is highly jealous of other pretty women being around her husband.
 Bamm-Bamm Rubble – The Rubbles' abnormally strong adopted son, they adopt him during the fourth season; his name comes from the only phrase he ever speaks as a baby: "Bamm, Bamm!"
 Hoppy – The Rubbles' pet hopparoo (a kangaroo/dinosaur combination creature), they purchase him at the beginning of the fifth season. When he first arrives, Dino and Fred mistake him for a giant mouse and are frightened of him, but they eventually become best friends after Hoppy gets help when they are in an accident. He babysits the kids as he takes them around in his pouch, which also serves as a shopping cart for Betty.

Other characters
Over 100 other characters appeared throughout the program. Below are those who have made more than one appearance:

 Mr. George Slate – Fred and Barney's hot-tempered boss at the gravel pit, he fires Fred on several occasions throughout the series, only to give him his job back by the end of the episode. A running gag is Slate's ever-changing first name, which was revealed to be Sylvester, Seymour, Nate, Oscar, and George as the series progressed. In the episode "The Long, Long, Long Weekend", which originally aired on January 21, 1966, he is shown as being the founder of "Slate Rock and Gravel Company"; still in business two million years later, the company is operated by his descendant, "George Slate the Eighty-thousandth". In the early Flintstones episodes, the more recognized "Mr. Slate" character was known as "Mr. Rockhead" and was a supervisor of Fred. Mr. Slate was a short character. During the course of the cartoon, the two men switched identities and the shorter character faded away.
 Arnold – The Flintstones' paperboy, Fred absolutely despises him, mainly because Arnold is frequently able to best and outsmart Fred at a number of tasks and also because he often ("unintentionally") throws the newspaper in Fred's face. Arnold's parents are mentioned in the series, but his mother Doris, a friend of Wilma and Betty (as evidenced in the episode "The Little Stranger", which originally aired on November 2, 1962), is referenced in name only, never actually appearing onscreen. Arnold's father, however, did appear in the episode "Take Me Out to the Ball Game", which originally aired on April 27, 1962, though his name is never mentioned.
 Joe Rockhead – A mutual friend of Fred and Barney, Fred usually mentions doing something (such as going to a baseball game) with Joe when Fred and Barney have some kind of falling out. Joe was, at some point, the fire chief of the Bedrock Volunteer Fire Department as shown on the episode "Arthur Quarry's Dance Class", which originally aired on January 13, 1961. His appearance varied throughout the run of the series, but his appearance in the episode "The Picnic", which originally aired on December 15, 1961, was the one most commonly used.
 Sam Slagheap – The Grand Poobah of the Water Buffalo Lodge.
 The Hatrocks – A family of hillbillies. They originally feuded with the Flintstones' Arkanstone branch in the style of the Hatfield–McCoy feud. Fred and Barney reignite a feud with them in "The Bedrock Hillbillies" when Fred inherits San Cemente from the late Zeke Flintstone where the dispute was over who made the portrait of Fred's great-great-uncle Zeke. The Hatrocks later returned in "The Hatrocks and the Gruesomes" where they bunk with the Flintstones during their trip to Bedrock World's Fair and their antics start to annoy them while guilt-tripping Fred into extending their stay. It is also revealed that the Hatrocks dislike bug music. The Flintstones, the Rubbles, and the Gruesomes were able to drive them away by performing the Four Insects song "She Said Yeah Yeah Yeah". When they found that the Bedrock World's Fair was having the Four Insects performing, the Hatrocks fled back to Arkanstone.
 Jethro Hatrock – The patriarch of the Hatrock Family. He had brown hair in "The Hatrocks and the Flintstones" and taupe-gray hair in "The Hatrocks and the Gruesomes".
 Gravella Hatrock – Jethro's wife.
 Zack Hatrock – Jethro and Gravella's oldest son.
 Slab Hatrock – The youngest son of Jethro and Gravella.
 Granny Hatrock – The mother of Jethro and grandmother of Zack and Slab.
 Benji Hatrock – Jethro's son-in-law.
 Percy – The Hatrock's pet dogasaurus.
 The Gruesomes – A creepy but friendly family, they move in next door to the Flintstones in later seasons.
 Weirdly Gruesome – The patriarch of the Gruesome family who works as a reality-show host.
 Creepella Gruesome – Weirdly's tall wife.
 Goblin "Gobby" Gruesome – Weirdly and Creepella's son.
 Uncle Ghastly – The towering uncle of Gobby from Creepella's side of the family, he is mostly shown as a large furry hand with claws coming out of a small door, a well, or a wall. His shadow was also seen in their debut episode giving the viewers an idea on what he might look like. Uncle Ghastly wasn't named until his second appearance.
 Occy – The Gruesome family's pet giant octopus.
 Schneider – Gobby's pet giant spider.
 The Great Gazoo – An alien from the planet Zetox who was exiled to Earth. He helps Fred and Barney with his reality-warping abilities, often against their will. The Great Gazoo is actually from the future and is quite dismayed when he realizes he has been sent back to "the Stone Age". He can be seen only by Fred, Barney, Pebbles, Bamm-Bamm, other small children, Dino, and Hoppy. Gazoo appeared in the final season only.

Voice cast
 Alan Reed – Fred Flintstone, Uncle Ghastly
 Jean Vander Pyl – Wilma Flintstone, Pebbles Flintstone
 Mel Blanc – Barney Rubble, Dino, Zack Hatrock
 Daws Butler – Barney Rubble (Season 2; episodes 1, 2, 5, 6 and 9 only)
 Bea Benaderet – Betty Rubble (Seasons 1–4), Gravella Hatrock
 Gerry Johnson – Betty Rubble (Seasons 5–6), Granny Hatrock (in "The Hatrocks and the Gruesomes")
 Don Messick – Bamm-Bamm Rubble, Hoppy, Arnold, Gobby Gruesome
 John Stephenson – Mr. Slate, Joe Rockhead, Sam Slagheap
 Verna Felton – Wilma's mother (Seasons 2 and 3)
 Janet Waldo – Pearl Slaghoople (Seasons 4 and 6)
 Harvey Korman – The Great Gazoo

Guest stars
 Hoagy Carmichael - Himself (in "The Hit Songwriters")
 Tony Curtis - Stony Curtis (in "The Return of Stony Curtis")
 Ann-Margret - Ann-Margrock (in "Ann-Margrock Presents")
 Elizabeth Montgomery - Samantha (in "Samantha")
 Jimmy O'Neill - Himself (in "Shinrock-A-Go-Go")
 Willard Waterman (in "The Long Long Weekend")
 Dick York - Darrin (in "Samantha")

Additional voice cast
 Henry Corden
 Walker Edmiston
 June Foray – Granny Hatrock (in "The Bedrock Hillbillies")
 Sandra Gould
 Naomi Lewis – Creepella Gruesome
 Howard McNear - Doctor, appeared in 3 episodes
 Allan Melvin
 Howard Morris – Weirdly Gruesome, Schneider, Jethro Hatrock, Slab Hatrock, Percy
 Hal Smith
 Ginny Tyler
 Paula Winslowe
 Doug Young – Benji Hatrock

Voice-actor details
Fred Flintstone physically resembles both the first voice actor who played him, Alan Reed, and Jackie Gleason, whose series, The Honeymooners, inspired The Flintstones. The voice of Barney Rubble was provided by voice actor Mel Blanc, except for five episodes during the second season (the first, second, fifth, sixth, and ninth); Hanna-Barbera regular Daws Butler filled in and provided the voice of Barney while Blanc was incapacitated by a near-fatal car accident. Blanc was able to return to the series much sooner than expected, by virtue of a temporary recording studio for the entire cast set up at Blanc's bedside. Blanc's Barney voice varied from nasal to deep before his accident, as he and Barbera (who directed the sessions with Alan Dinehart) explored the right level in relation to the comedy and the other characters. Blanc uses both Barney voices in one of the earliest episodes, "The Prowler."

Reed was insistent on playing Fred in a relatively natural speaking voice, rather than a broad, "cartoony" style. Few animated short cartoons used this "straightforward" method, except for experimental studios like UPA and feature films with more realistic characters. The performances of Reed and the cast (as well as the writing) helped ground the animated world of The Flintstones in a relatable reality. The dialogue style of The Flintstones set a precedent for acting in animation that continues to exist today, sometimes falsely attributed in modern animated productions as "revolutionary."

In a 1986 Playboy interview, Gleason said Alan Reed had done voice-overs for Gleason in his early movies and that he had considered suing Hanna-Barbera for copying The Honeymooners, but decided to let it pass. According to Henry Corden, a voice actor and a friend of Gleason's, "Jackie's lawyers told him he could probably have The Flintstones pulled right off the air. But they also told him, 'Do you want to be known as the guy who yanked Fred Flintstone off the air? The guy who took away a show so many kids love and so many parents love, too?'"

Henry Corden first spoke for Fred Flintstone on the 1965 record album Songs From Mary Poppins, then continued doing the voice for most of the other Flintstone records on the label. At roughly the same time, Corden was providing Fred's singing voice in two films being produced at the studio: the 1966 special Alice in Wonderland, or What's a Nice Kid Like You Doing in a Place Like This? and the 1966 feature film The Man Called Flintstone. Corden assumed the role completely after Reed's death in 1977, starting with the TV special, A Flintstone Christmas. 

Since 2000, Jeff Bergman, James Arnold Taylor, and Scott Innes (performing both Fred and Barney for Toshiba commercials) have performed the voice of Fred. Since Mel Blanc's death in 1989, Barney has been voiced by Jeff Bergman, Frank Welker, and Kevin Michael Richardson. Various additional character voices were created by Hal Smith, Allan Melvin, Janet Waldo, Daws Butler, and Howard Morris, among others.

Episodes

Music

The opening- and closing-credits theme during the first two seasons was called "Rise and Shine", a lively instrumental underscore accompanying Fred on his drive home from work. . Starting in season three, episode three ("Barney the Invisible"), the opening- and closing-credits theme was the familiar vocal "Meet the Flintstones". This version was recorded with a 22-piece big band conducted by composer Hoyt Curtin and performed by the Randy Van Horne Singers. The melody is derived from part of the 'B' section of Beethoven's Piano Sonata No. 17 Movement 2, composed in 1801/02. The "Meet the Flintstones" opening was later added to the first two seasons for syndication. The musical underscores were credited to Hoyt Curtin for the show's first five seasons; Ted Nichols took over in 1965 for the final season. Many early episodes used the underscores composed for Top Cat and The Jetsons. Episodes of the last two seasons used the underscore of Jonny Quest for the more adventurous stories.

History and production
The idea of The Flintstones started after Hanna-Barbera produced The Huckleberry Hound Show and The Quick Draw McGraw Show. Although these programs were successful, they did not have the same wide audience appeal as their previous theatrical cartoon series Tom and Jerry, which entertained both children and the adults who accompanied them. Since children did not need their parents' supervision to watch television, though, Hanna-Barbera's output became labeled "kids only". Barbera and Hanna wanted to recapture the adult audience with an animated situation comedy.

Barbera and Hanna considered making the two families hillbillies (a hillbilly theme was later incorporated into two Flintstones episodes, "The Bedrock Hillbillies" and "The Hatrocks and the Gruesomes"), ancient Romans (Hanna-Barbera eventually created The Roman Holidays), pilgrims, or American Indians before deciding on a Stone Age setting. According to Barbera, they settled on that because "you could take anything that was current, and convert it to stone-age". Under the working title The Flagstones, a treatment was written by Harry Winkler. The family originally consisted of Fred, Wilma, and their son, Fred, Jr. A brief demonstration film was also created to sell the idea of a "modern stone-age family" to sponsors and the network. It was a difficult sell, and required eight weeks of daily presentations to networks and ad agencies. June Foray and Hanna-Barbera regular Daws Butler voiced the characters for the demonstration film, but Foray was dropped without warning before production began; Foray was upset about the rejection and refused to work with Hanna-Barbera for many years afterward, despite Barbera's efforts to offer her other work. Animator Kenneth Muse, who worked on the Tom and Jerry cartoons, also worked on the early seasons of The Flintstones.

William Hanna was honest about the inspiration, saying, "At that time, The Honeymooners was the most popular show on the air, and for my bill, the funniest. The characters, I thought, were terrific. Now, that influenced greatly what we did with The Flintstones ... The Honeymooners was there, and we used that as a kind of basis for the concept." Joseph Barbera disavowed these claims in a separate interview, though, stating, "I don't remember mentioning The Honeymooners when I sold the show, but if people want to compare The Flintstones to The Honeymooners, then great. It's a total compliment. The Honeymooners was one of the greatest shows ever written." 

Jackie Gleason, creator of The Honeymooners, considered suing Hanna-Barbera Productions, but decided that he did not want to be known as "the guy who yanked Fred Flintstone off the air". Gleason himself was sued because The Honeymooners was similar to The Bickersons, as critics noted at the time, and the lawsuit served by Bickersons creator Philip Rapp was settled out of court. Another influence was noted during Hanna-Barbera's tenure at MGM, where they were in a friendly competition with fellow cartoon director Tex Avery. In 1955, Avery directed a cartoon entitled The First Bad Man (narrated by cowboy legend Tex Ritter). The cartoon concerned the rowdy antics of a bank robber in stone-age Dallas. Many of the sight gags from that series antedated similar situations used by Hanna-Barbera in the Flintstones series by many years. Some students of American animation point to this cartoon as a progenitive seed of the Flintstones.

The concept was also antedated by the "Stone Age Cartoons" series of 12 animated cartoons released from January to September 1940 by Fleischer Studios. These cartoons show stone-age people doing modern things with primitive means. One example is "Granite Hotel" including characters such as a newsboy, telephone operator, hotel clerk, and a spoof of Edgar Bergen and Charlie McCarthy.

Barbera explained that selling the show to a network and sponsors was not an easy task.

When the series went into production, the working title The Flagstones was changed, possibly to avoid confusion with the Flagstons, characters in the comic strip Hi and Lois. After spending a brief period in development as The Gladstones (GLadstone being a Los Angeles telephone exchange at the time), Hanna-Barbera settled upon The Flintstones, and the idea of the Flintstones having a child from the start was discarded, with Fred and Wilma starting out as a childless couple. However, some early Flintstones merchandise, such as a 1961 Little Golden Book, included "Fred Jr".

Despite the animation and fantasy setting, the series was initially aimed at adult audiences, which was reflected in the comedy writing, that as noted, resembled the average primetime sitcoms of the era, with the usual family issues resolved with a laugh at the end of each episode, as well as the inclusion of a laugh track. Hanna and Barbera hired many writers from the world of live-action, including two of Jackie Gleason's writers, Herbert Finn and Sydney Zelinka, as well as relative newcomer Joanna Lee, while still using traditional animation story men such as Warren Foster and Michael Maltese.

The Flintstones premiered on September 30, 1960, at 8:30 pm Eastern time, and quickly became a hit. It was the first American animated show to depict two people of the opposite sex (Fred and Wilma; Barney and Betty) sleeping together in one bed, although Fred and Wilma are sometimes depicted as sleeping in separate beds. For comparison, the first live-action depiction of this in American TV history was in television's first-ever sitcom: 1947's Mary Kay and Johnny.

The first two seasons were co-sponsored by Winston cigarettes and the characters appeared in several black-and-white television commercials for Winston (dictated by the custom, at that time, that the star(s) of a TV series often "pitched" their sponsor's product in an "integrated commercial" at the end of the episode).

During the third season, Hanna and Barbera decided that Fred and Wilma should have a baby. Originally, Hanna and Barbera intended for the Flintstone family to have a boy, but the head of the marketing department convinced them to change it to a girl since "girl dolls sell a lot better than boy dolls". Although most Flintstones episodes were stand-alone storylines, Hanna-Barbera created a story arc surrounding the birth of Pebbles. Beginning with the episode "The Surprise", aired midway through the third season (January 25, 1963), in which Wilma reveals her pregnancy to Fred, the arc continued through the time leading up to Pebbles's birth in the episode "Dress Rehearsal" (February 22, 1963), and then continued with several episodes showing Fred and Wilma adjusting to the world of parenthood. Around this time, Winston pulled out their sponsorship and Welch's (grape juice and grape jellies) became the primary sponsor, as the show's audience began to shift younger. The integrated commercials for Welch's products feature Pebbles asking for grape juice in her toddler dialect, and Fred explaining to Pebbles Welch's unique process for making the jelly, compared to the competition. Welch's also produced a line of grape jelly packaged in jars that were reusable as drinking glasses, with painted scenes featuring the Flintstones and characters from the show. In Australia, the Nine Network ran a "Name the Flintstones' baby" competition during the 'pregnancy' episodes—few Australian viewers were expected to have a U.S. connection giving them information about past Flintstone episodes. An American won the contest and received an all-expenses-paid trip to tour Hanna-Barbera Studios.
Another arc occurred in the fourth season, in which the Rubbles, depressed over being unable to have children of their own (making The Flintstones the first animated series in history to address the issue of infertility, though subtly), adopt Bamm-Bamm. The 100th episode made (but the 90th to air), "Little Bamm-Bamm Rubble" (October 3, 1963), established how Bamm-Bamm was adopted. Nine episodes were produced before it, but aired afterward, which explains why Bamm-Bamm was not seen again until episode 101, "Daddies Anonymous" (Bamm-Bamm was in a teaser on episode 98, "Kleptomaniac Pebbles"). Another story arc, occurring in the final season, centered on Fred and Barney's dealings with the Great Gazoo (voiced by Harvey Korman).

After Pebbles's birth, the audience demographic had become wider and the series was marketed as a family series rather than the "adult" animated show of the earlier seasons. Between a wider number of viewers every year in the country, more children watching and competition from TV's trend toward fantasy shows, the episodes varied from family comedy and fantasy/adventure, but there were still stories about the couple dynamic. The last original episode was broadcast on April 1, 1966.

The first three seasons of The Flintstones aired Friday nights at 8:30 Eastern time on ABC, with the first two seasons in black-and-white. Beginning with the third season in 1962, ABC televised the Flintstones in color, one of the first programs in color on that network. Season four and part of season five aired Thursdays at 7:30. The rest of the series aired Fridays at 7:30.

In the U.S., besides being part of NBC Saturday mornings from 1966 to 1970, the syndicated reruns of the series were offered to local stations until 1997, when E/I regulations and changing tastes in the industry led to the show's move to cable television. From the time of Ted Turner's purchase of Hanna-Barbera in 1991, TBS, TNT, and Cartoon Network aired the program. On April 1, 2000, the program moved to Boomerang, where it aired until March 6, 2017 (in its last years on the channel, it had been relegated to a graveyard slot) and returned to the channel on July 30, 2018. Online, the series was made available on the In2TV service beginning in 2006, then the online version of Kids' WB until that service was discontinued in 2015. As of 2017, full episodes are only available in the U.S. on Boomerang's subscription video-on-demand service, with select clips made available on the official YouTube account tied to the revamped Kids' WB website. In 2019, MeTV acquired rerun rights to the series, returning the show to broadcast television for the first time in over 20 years. All seasons of this series can currently be streamed on HBO Max, a streaming service Warner Bros. Discovery's and Tubi, a streaming service owned by Fox Corporation.

Reception
The night after The Flintstones premiered, Variety called it "a pen-and-ink disaster", and the series was among many that debuted in a "vast wasteland" of a 1960–61 television season considered one of the worst in television history up to that point. As late as the 1980s, highbrow critics derided the show's limited animation and derivative plots. Animation historian Michael Barrier disliked the series, calling it a "dumb sitcom" and stated that "I can readily understand why someone who as a small child enjoyed, say, The Flintstones might regard that show fondly today. I have a lot more trouble understanding why anyone would try to defend anything about it on artistic grounds."

Despite the mixed critical reviews following its premiere, The Flintstones has generally been considered a television classic and was rerun continuously for five decades after its end. In 1961, The Flintstones became the first animated series to be nominated for the Primetime Emmy Award for Outstanding Comedy Series, but lost out to The Jack Benny Program. In January 2009, IGN named The Flintstones as the ninth-best in its "Top 100 Animated TV Shows". The first season of the series received an approval rating of 100% on review aggregator Rotten Tomatoes, based on five reviews. Common Sense Media gave the series a three out of five stars, saying: "Still a classic, but times have changed."

Nielsen ratings

Films and subsequent television series
Following the show's cancellation in 1966, a film based upon the series was created. The Man Called Flintstone was a musical spy caper that parodied James Bond and other secret agents. The movie was released to theaters on August 3, 1966, by Columbia Pictures. It was released on DVD by Warner Home Video in Canada in March 2005 and in United States in December 2008.

The show was revived in the early 1970s with Pebbles and Bamm-Bamm having grown into teenagers, and several different series and made-for-TV movies (broadcast mainly on Saturday mornings, with a few shown in primetime), including a series depicting Fred and Barney as police officers, another depicting the characters as children, and yet others featuring Fred and Barney encountering Marvel Comics superhero The Thing and Al Capp's comic strip character The Shmoo—have appeared over the years. The original show also was adapted into a live-action film in 1994, and a prequel, The Flintstones in Viva Rock Vegas, which followed in 2000. Unlike its sister show The Jetsons (the two shows appeared in a made-for-TV crossover movie in 1987), the revival programs were not widely syndicated or rerun alongside the original series.

Television series
Original runs:
 The Pebbles and Bamm-Bamm Show (1971–72) (one season)
 The Flintstone Comedy Hour (1972–73) (one season)
 The New Fred and Barney Show (1979) (two seasons)
 The Flintstone Comedy Show (1980–82) (two seasons)
 The Flintstone Kids (1986–88) (two seasons)
 What a Cartoon! – featuring Dino: Stay Out! (1995) and Dino: The Great Egg-Scape (1997)
 Cave Kids (1996) (one season)
 The Rubbles (2002) (shorts)
 Yabba Dabba Dinosaurs (2021–22) (two seasons)
 Bedrock (TBA)

Compilation shows:
 The Flintstone Comedy Show (1973–74) 
 Fred Flintstone and Friends (1977–78)
 Fred and Barney Meet the Thing (1979) (the only original content on this show was not related to the Flintstones)
 Fred and Barney Meet the Shmoo (1979–80) (the only original content on this show was not related to the Flintstones)
 The Flintstone Funnies (1982–84)

Theatrical animated feature
 The Man Called Flintstone (1966, released by Columbia Pictures)
 Space Jam: A New Legacy (2021) - The Flintstones, the Rubbles, the Great Gazoo, a purple Bronto-Crane, and a blue Bronto-Crane make cameos watching the basketball game between the Tune Squad and the Goon Squad.

Television specials
 The Flintstones on Ice (1973)
 A Flintstone Christmas (1977)
 The Flintstones: Little Big League (1978)
 The Flintstones' New Neighbors (1980)
 The Flintstones Meet Rockula and Frankenstone (1980)
 The Flintstones: Fred's Final Fling (1980)
 The Flintstones: Wind-Up Wilma (1981)
 The Flintstones: Jogging Fever (1981)
 The Flintstones' 25th Anniversary Celebration (1986)
 The Flintstone Kids' "Just Say No" Special (1988)
 Hanna-Barbera's 50th: A Yabba Dabba Doo Celebration (1989)
 A Flintstone Family Christmas (1993)

Television films
 The Jetsons Meet the Flintstones (1987)
 I Yabba-Dabba Do! (1993)
 Hollyrock-a-Bye Baby (1993)
 A Flintstones Christmas Carol (1994)
 The Flintstones: On the Rocks (2001)

Educational films
The Flintstones: Library Skills Series (Sound Filmstrip Kit, Xerox Films)
Barney Borrows a Book (1976)
Barney Returns a Book (1976)
 Energy: A National Issue (1977)
 Hanna-Barbera Educational Filmstrips
Bamm-Bamm: Bamm-Bamm Tackles a Term Paper (1978)
Bamm-Bamm: Information Please (1979)
The Flintstones: A Weighty Problem (1980)
The Flintstones: Fire Alarm (1980)
The Flintstones: Fire Escape (1980)
The Flintstones' Driving Guide (1980)
Learning Tree Filmstrip Set
Learning About Families with The Flintstones (1982)
Learning About Basic Needs with The Flintstones (1982)
The Flintstones: Child Guidance Show 'N Tell Picturesound Program (Record and Filmstrip)
Fred Learns to Share (1984)
Fred's Tall Tale (1984)

Live-action films
 The Flintstones (1994)
 The Flintstones in Viva Rock Vegas (2000)

Direct-to-video films
 The Flintstones & WWE: Stone Age SmackDown! (2015)

Other media

Canceled Seth MacFarlane reboot
In 2011, it was announced Family Guy creator Seth MacFarlane would be reviving The Flintstones for the Fox network, with the first episode airing in 2013. After Fox Entertainment president Kevin Reilly read the pilot script and "liked it but didn't love it", MacFarlane chose to abandon work on the project rather than restarting it.

Concept art of the series was posted on background artist Andy Clark’s website.

Yabba Dabba Dinosaurs

Yabba Dabba Dinosaurs is an American animated web television series spin-off of The Flintstones that premiered in 2020, the first to feature them since they appeared in the 2002 series The Rubbles, and produced by Warner Bros. Animation. It was produced by Mark Marek and Marly Halpern-Graser.

Like Cave Kids, the show focuses on the lives of best friends Pebbles Flintstone and Bamm-Bamm Rubble, who are joined by Dino for many adventures in the Stone Age. The show was scheduled to be released as a part of the Boomerang IPTV subscription service. On August 19, 2021, it was announced the series would instead be released on HBO Max on September 30, 2021. The series was set to first air on Teletoon as a regular television series in Canada in September 2019, but ended up airing in September 2020.
The show started airing on February 3, 2020, on Boomerang UK.

Upcoming animated film
In 2014, it was announced that Warner Bros. was developing an animated film with Chris Henchy, Will Ferrell, and Adam McKay, to write the script for the project. Ferrell and McKay would also be executive producers. In 2018, it was confirmed that the project is still in development and produced by Warner Animation Group, but if the crew members would still be involved is unknown.

Bedrock
In 2019, it was reported that a new Flintstones reboot series, directed to an adult audience, is in development by Elizabeth Banks and her production company Brownstone Productions. In 2021, the series was now co-produced by Fox Entertainment and Warner Bros. Animation along with Brownstone and received the title Bedrock. The new series takes place two decades after the original series with Fred Flintstone on the verge of retirement and a twenty-something Pebbles (voiced by Banks) trying to find her way in life as the Stone Age comes to an end and the Bronze Age arrives.On March 10, 2023 it was reported the series will also feature the voices of Stephen Root (Fred), Amy Sedaris (Wilma), Joe Lo Truglio (Barney), Nicole Byer (Betty) and Manny Jacinto (Bamm-Bamm). It was also reported that Fox had ordered a pilot presentation of the series which will be written by Lindsay Kerns.

Theme parks
Three Flintstones-themed amusement parks have existed in the United States. One was Bedrock City in Custer, South Dakota. It closed in 2015 when the new owner Mike Tennyson and Warner Bros. could not come to an agreement over changes. It was too expensive for the repairs and changes that Warner Brother wanted, having Tennyson closed it. The entire site was bulldozed in April 2019. The second one, near Williams, Arizona, was still open for the summer of 2019 but slated to close by 2020. It cost $5 per person to get in. Both parks had been in operation for decades.

A third park existed until the 1990s at Carowinds in Charlotte, North Carolina.

In Canada, Flintstone Park in Kelowna, British Columbia, opened in 1968 and closed in 1998; it was notable for the "Forty Foot Fred" billboard of Fred Flintstone which was a well-known Kelowna landmark.
Another Flintstones park was located in Bridal Falls, British Columbia, which closed in 1990. Calaway Park outside Calgary, Alberta, also opened with a Flintstones theme and many of the buildings today have a caveman-like design, though the park no longer licenses the characters. The Australia's Wonderland and Canada's Wonderland theme parks, both featured Flintstones characters in their Hanna-Barbera-themed children's sections from 1985 until the mid-1990s. Kings Island (near Cincinnati) and Kings Dominion (near Richmond, Virginia) had a Hanna-Barbera land, in which many Hanna-Barbera characters were featured, including the Flintstones, in the early 1970s, 1980s and early 1990s. Bedrock is one of the themed lands in the indoor Warner Bros. World Abu Dhabi park in Abu Dhabi, United Arab Emirates, mainly home to the Flintstones Bedrock River Adventure flume ride.

Live theater
A stage production opened at Universal Studios Hollywood in 1994 (the year the live-action film was released), developed by Universal and Hanna-Barbera Productions, at the Panasonic Theater, replacing the Star Trek show. The story consists of Fred, Wilma, Barney, and Betty heading for "Hollyrock". The show ran until January 2, 1997.

In popular culture

Miles Laboratories (now part of Bayer Corporation) and their One-A-Day vitamin brand was the alternate sponsor of the original Flintstones series during its first two seasons, and in the late 1960s, Miles introduced Flintstones Chewable Vitamins, fruit-flavored multivitamin tablets for children in the shape of the Flintstones characters, which are still currently being sold.

The Simpsons referenced The Flintstones in several episodes. In the episode "Homer's Night Out", Homer's local convenience store clerk, Apu, remarks "You look familiar, sir. Are you on the television or something?", to which Homer replies "Sorry, buddy, you've got me confused with Fred Flintstone." During the couch gag of the opening credits of the episode "Kamp Krusty", the Simpson family arrive home to find the Flintstone family already sitting on their couch. The same couch gag was reused in syndicated episodes of "The Itchy & Scratchy & Poochie Show", when The Simpsons overtook The Flintstones as the longest-running animated series. In "Lady Bouvier's Lover", Homer's boss, Mr. Burns, appears at the family's house and says "Why, it's Fred Flintstone (referring to Homer) and his lovely wife, Wilma! (Marge) Oh, and this must be little Pebbles! (Maggie) Mind if I come in? I brought chocolates." Homer responds by saying "Yabba-dabba-doo!" The opening of "Marge vs. the Monorail" depicts Homer leaving work in a similar way to Fred Flintstone in the opening of The Flintstones, during which he sings his own version of the latter's opening theme only to slam into a chestnut tree.

On September 30, 2010, Google temporarily replaced the logo on its search page with a custom graphic celebrating the 50th anniversary of The Flintstones first TV broadcast.

See also

 List of works produced by Hanna-Barbera Productions
 List of Hanna-Barbera characters
 Hanna-Barbera's All-Star Comedy Ice Revue, a 1978 special in which Hanna-Barbera characters honor Fred in an all-star celebrity roast for his birthday
 Alley Oop, a comic strip about a prehistoric family with commentary on American suburban life 
 The Cavern Clan, a Brazilian comic strip about prehistoric life in the Stone Age
 Prehistoric Peeps, a 1890 cartoon strip depicting cavemen with modern sensibilities living with dinosaurs

Notes

References

Books

Further reading
 "The Flintstones": The Official Guide to the Cartoon Series, by Jerry Beck, Running Press, 2011.

External links

 
 
 The Flintstones – Cartoon Network Department of Cartoons (Archive)
 Museum of Broadcast Communications: The Flintstones 

 
1960s American adult animated television series
1960s American sitcoms
1960s American comedy television series
1960 American television series debuts
1966 American television series endings
American adult animated comedy television series
American Broadcasting Company original programming
American adult animated fantasy television series
American animated sitcoms
Animated television series about dinosaurs
Animated television series about families
English-language television shows
Fictional married couples
Prehistoric people in popular culture
Television shows adapted into comics
Television shows adapted into films
Television shows adapted into video games
Television series by Hanna-Barbera
Television series by Sony Pictures Television
Television series by Warner Bros. Television Studios
Television series set in prehistory
Television series by Screen Gems
YTV (Canadian TV channel) original programming
Television series about cavemen